Andì Meriem Matalatta (August 31, 1957 – June 4, 2010) was an Indonesian pop singer known for hits, especially during the 1980s.  She was nicknamed "The Pearl from the South" among Indonesians.

She was born on August 31, 1957, in Makassar, Sulawesi, Indonesia, as the fifth of six children. She had one daughter, Diana, with her first husband, Bambang Hertasning. She later remarried to her second husband, Hendra Pribadi.

Andì Meriem Matalatta died at a hospital in Zoetermeer, the Netherlands, of complications of multiple illnesses, including diabetes, on June 4, 2010, at the age of 53. She had been visiting the Netherlands with her daughter, Diana. She had been suffering from a gangrenous wound on her hand and hypertension.

Her body was flown back to Indonesia for her funeral.

References

External links
Andi Meriem Matalatta Dies at 52 in Netherlands 

1957 births
2010 deaths
Bugis people
20th-century Indonesian women singers
Indonesian pop singers
People from Makassar
Deaths from diabetes